The GMC Typhoon is a high-performance SUV, produced from 1992 until 1993 by GMC. The Typhoon was based on the 1991 GMC Syclone.

Description
Like the GMC Syclone, the Typhoon is powered by a 4.3 L LB4 V6 engine with unique pistons, main caps, head gaskets, intake manifolds, fuel system, exhaust manifolds, and a 48mm twin bore throttle body from the 5.7 L GM Small-Block engine, producing  and 650 lb⋅ft (975 N⋅m) of torque. The engine is a modified version of the Vortec engine found in the standard Jimmy, which originally produced . The engine uses a Mitsubishi TD06-17C/8 cm2 turbocharger producing 14 psi of boost and a Garrett Water/Air intercooler, as well as revised intake manifolds, fuel system, exhaust manifolds, and a  twin-bore throttle body from the 5.7 L GM Small-Block engine. The Typhoon sends power to all four wheels through a 4L60 4-speed automatic transmission and a BorgWarner 4472 (the Syclone used a BorgWarner 1372) transfer case splitting torque with 35% forward and 65% to the rear wheels. Other features include upgraded brakes, a limited-slip rear differential and sport modifications to the standard suspensions. Unlike the Syclone, the Typhoon featured an air-operated self-leveling rear suspension.

Car and Driver compared the Syclone's performance favorably to the Ferrari 348ts, Chevrolet Corvette, and Nissan 300ZX Turbo. It cost 29,970, though the magazine criticized the plastic interior pieces.

Production and colors
All three model years were built for GMC by Production Automotive Services of Troy, Michigan. Aside from a handful of prototypes, only 4,697 Typhoons were built by GMC: 2,497 for 1992, and 2,200 for 1993. Unlike regular production Syclones, Typhoons were offered in various color configurations that differed by year, with black/black being the most common.

1991
 Typhoon Pre-Production (6 total)

1992
 Black w/ Black (1262 total)
 Black w/ Gray (130 total)
 Frost White w/ Gray (518 total)
 Apple Red w/ Gray (345 total)
 Bright Teal w/ Gray (132 total)
 Forest Green Metallic w/ Gray (82 total)
 Aspen Blue w/ Gray (28 total)
 Radar Blue w/ Radar Blue (2 total)
 Raspberry Metallic w/ Raspberry Metallic (2 total)

1993
 Black w/ Black (1,008 total)
 Black w/ Gray (98 total)
 Frost White w/ White (532 total)
 Frost White w/ Gray (115 total)
 Apple Red w/ Apple Red (77 total)
 Apple Red w/ Gray (101 total)
 Forest Green Metallic w/ Gray (210 total)
 Garnet Red w/ Gray (24 total)
 Royal Blue Metallic w/ Gray (35 total)

Notes

References

External links

Typhoon
Mid-size sport utility vehicles
Cars introduced in 1991
Motor vehicles manufactured in the United States